Kevyn Morrow is an American actor, originally from Omaha, Nebraska. His career has taken him from the American stage, to London, UK, to film and television.

Stage

Broadway and Off-Broadway
Morrow made his Broadway debut as a member of the original cast of Leader of the Pack, which also featured Broadway star Annie Golden. He soon after joined the cast of the legendary A Chorus Line, and was a member of the show's 1990 closing cast. His next Broadway show would be as an original cast member of another Michael Bennett hit, Dreamgirls. He would play various roles in the cast throughout its run both on Broadway, on tour, and in its 1987 revival, but most notably the role of C.C. White, for which he received critical acclaim.

Following Dreamgirls, Morrow appeared in Smokey Joe's Cafe, Dream, The Scarlet Pimpernel, and the 2002 revival of Anything Goes.

Off-Broadway he appeared in the original production of The Bubbly Black Girl Sheds Her Chameleon Skin, which also featured TONY winner La Chanze, and Blue where he played the title character of Blue Williams. He recently appeared in the premiere presentation of Ripper the musical, directed by Stephen Amato at New World Stages. In 2014, Morrow will appear in the Primary Stages production of While I Yet Live.

London
In 2002 he made his West End debut in Rob Bettinson and Alan Janes' 125th Street at the Shaftesbury Theatre. Following that production, Morrow starred in the London premiere of Ragtime, directed by Stafford Arima at the Piccadilly Theatre, as Coalhouse Walker Jr., a performance for which he would be nominated for the Olivier Award for Best Actor in a Musical.

Regional
He has appeared in numerous productions throughout the United States, but most notably for Once on This Island at the Bay Street Theatre (the production was filmed for the Lincoln Center Archives), Ragtime in Omaha, Nebraska (where he won the award for Best Performance by a Visiting Actor), Tambourines to Glory in Washington D.C. (where he was nominated for the Helen Hayes Award), the role of Curtis Taylor in Dreamgirls, and the role of Billy Strayhorn in the national touring company of Stormy Weather, starring Leslie Uggams as Lena Horne, including at the Prince Music Theatre in Philadelphia.6

Television
Kevyn Morrow's television appearances include a recurring role on One Life to Live (appearing in June) as well as appearances on Law & Order, Hope and Faith, Coach, Murphy Brown, Ed, and many others.

Film
Morrow has appeared in multiple films, including the 1983 John Travolta film Staying Alive And in 2002 film Barbershop as monk.

Other
Morrow is a member of the Broadway show choir and occasionally works as a choreographer regionally.

References

External links
 
 https://m.imdb.com/name/nm0607515

American male film actors
American male television actors
American male stage actors
American male musical theatre actors
Living people
Male actors from Nebraska
Year of birth missing (living people)
Place of birth missing (living people)